Old Wanderers was a cricket ground in Johannesburg, South Africa. It was established in the 1880s and was the venue for 22 Test matches between 1896 and 1939 and was used for first-class cricket until 1945 after which it was built over, the site being used to build Johannesburg railway station. Test cricket in Johannesburg initially moved to Ellis Park before New Wanderers was opened.

In cricket, a five-wicket haul (also known as a "five-for" or "fifer") refers to a bowler taking five or more wickets in a single innings. This is regarded as a notable achievement. This article details the five-wicket hauls taken on the ground in official international Test matches.

A total of 40 five-wicket hauls were taken during the 22 Test matches played on the ground. Three five-wicket hauls were taken during the ground's first Test match in 1896. South Africa's George Rowe took the first, taking five wickets for the cost of 115 runs (5/115) from 49 five-ball overs during the first innings of the match. England's George Lohmann and Christopher Heseltine both took five-wicket hauls later in the match, Lohmann becoming the first player to take nine wickets in a Test match innings with his 9/28, figures which were not bettered until Jim Laker took all 10 wickets in an innings against Australia at Old Trafford in 1956.

The ground also saw a new record for best Test match bowling figures in 1913 when England's Sydney Barnes took 17 wickets in a match. These have only been bettered by Laker, who took 19 wickets in the match against Australia in 1956.

Key

Five-wicket hauls
A total of 40 five-wicket hauls were taken in Test matches on the ground.

Notes

References

External links
International five-wicket hauls at Old Wanderers, CricInfo

Old Wanderers